is a passenger railway station located in the city of Zama, Kanagawa, Japan, and operated by the private railway operator Odakyu Electric Railway.

Lines
Sōbudai-mae Station is served by Odakyu Odawara Line, and is located 36.9 km from the line's Tokyo terminal at Shinjuku Station. It is the closest station to the US Army's Camp Zama facility and is close to the border of Zama with the city of Sagamihara.

Station layout

Sōbudai-mae Station has two island platforms and four tracks, connected to the station building by footbridges. The station building is elevated, and is located above the tracks and platforms.

Platforms

History
With the opening of the nearby Imperial Japanese Army Academy (Rikugun Shikan Gakkō), the station was renamed  on 1 June 1937. However, as part of the counter-intelligence movement to eliminate the names of military facilities from maps, the station was renamed Sōbudai-mae Station on 1 January 1941.

Station numbering was introduced in January 2014 with Sōbudai-mae being assigned station number OH30.

Passenger statistics
In fiscal 2019, the station was used by an average of 40,324 passengers daily.

The passenger figures for previous years are as shown below.

See also
 List of railway stations in Japan

References

External links

 station information 

Railway stations in Japan opened in 1927
Odakyu Odawara Line
Railway stations in Kanagawa Prefecture
Zama, Kanagawa